George Haswani (born 29 September 1946) is a Syrian-Russian businessman with close ties to the Syrian government of Bashar al-Assad, who owns the HESCO Engineering and Construction Company, a major engineering, construction and natural gas production company operating in Syria.

Biography
Hesco is owned by George Haswani, a Greek Catholic businessman from the city of Yabroud. George Haswani, was a mediator in the deal to free nuns in March 2015. Haswani has a close friendship with Syrian President Bashar al-Assad and others from his family, which gave him a great deal of influence that he used to win large contracts in oil and gas projects, such as Tweenan gas (the North Central Region gas project), the Arab gas pipeline project, and others.

Haswani also enjoys close ties with the top economic and political circles in Russia, which made him the right of Russia's favorite oil man in Syria, as some close to him say. HESCO has entered into remarkable business partnerships with Russian Stroytransgas in Iraq, Algeria, the UAE and Sudan. Stroytransgaz is owned by Russian billionaire Gennady Timchenko, who is closely affiliated with Russian President Vladimir Putin. Haswani boasts of his great role in persuading the Russian company to continue its projects after the issuance of the Western sanctions decision against foreign companies operating in Syria. To date, more than fifty Russian employees work in the company's offices in Damascus. Information on Haswani's life does not answer the secret of his fortune. All that is known about him is that he obtained a doctorate degree from the former Soviet Union in 1979, from a grant from the Syrian Ministry of Higher Education, for which he worked as a professor in the Faculty of Mechanical and Electrical Engineering, before he was appointed director of the Baniyas refinery for a short period, to leave the position and establish HESCO. Then he rose, with Bashar al-Assad presiding over the country in 2000, as one of the heads of oil and gas in Syria.

His projects
Thanks to his friendship with Assad, Haswani was able to obtain an amount of 120 million euros from the Ministry of Oil, as compensation for equipment, machinery and equipment that were subjected to looting and vandalism, which the ministry paid under the insurance clause in the contract signed between the two parties, after the site of the Tuenan gas project came out of the government's control in early 2013. The Twinan gas project was taken over by rebels (from the Qais Al-Qarni Brigade and the Al-Nusra Front) in January 2013. The rebels secured the Syrian and Russian engineers for their lives, so they continued to develop the project. In 2014, the Syrian newspaper Tishreen reported the same details of Jabhat al-Nusra's takeover of the project. In 2015, the project fell into the hands of ISIL, which continued to secure Syrian and Russian engineers in exchange for the project's gas production to go to the Aleppo power plant, which is controlled by ISIL, and the rest to Homs and Damascus. According to Abu Khaled, from the opposition Qais al-Qarni Brigade, George Haswani struck a deal with ISIL to share the proceeds of the Tuinan project. The agreement allowed project employees to change their work shifts through a military base of the Syrian army in Hama Governorate. Under the deal, the Syrian government will get 50 megawatts of electricity, ISIL will get 70 megawatts plus 300 barrels of oil condensate, and HESCO company pays ISIL $50,000 monthly for the protection of the equipment.

Controversy

Sanctions 
In 2016, US officials alleged that George Haswani acted as a middleman for stolen oil and gas sales between Islamic and the Syrian government. The US Treasury, EU and UK sanctioned Haswani for this alleged role as a broker.

Links to 2020 Beirut explosion 
In January 2021, Reuters reported that Syrian businessmen, including Mudalal Khoury and George Haswani, were possibly linked to the 2020 Beirut explosion. On 28 January 2021, Haswani denied any links to the explosion, which killed 207 people. He told Reuters he did not know anything about a company linked to the process of buying a shipment of chemicals that exploded. In an interview with Reuters at his home in Damascus, Haswani said that he had resorted to the Cypriot company Interstatus to register his company, which is the same agent that registered the Savaro company, and that the agent company had moved the registration site of the two companies to the same address on the same day. However, Haswani said that he did not know anything about Savaro, and that any links between it and his company are just a coincidence, because the two companies have the same agent. As stated in previous reports, Reuters was unable to determine whether Haswani had anything to do with Savaro. Haswani said, "I don’t know what other companies are registered by this Cypriot company, five or three or 70 or more." "It is a fabricated media whirlwind. We don’t know Savaro and we hadn’t heard about them before this.," Haswani told Reuters, commenting on reports indicating his involvement in the explosion. Interstatus did not respond to a request for comment. Marina Psyllou, the director of the Interstatus company, was listed in the registration documents of the company (Savaro) as the only owner and director of the company, but she denied that she was the real manager of the company. He told Reuters in mid-January 2021 that the beneficial owner of the company was another person, whom she refused to identify. She added that Savaro was a dormant company that had never conducted business. Haswani said that he was not contacted by any investigators from Lebanon or any other country regarding the explosion, and that he will soon work to file a legal case in Paris against media reports linking him to the explosion. He continued, "I am living my life normally and laughing because I am someone who knows well that I have nothing to do with this matter at all. Why would I worry?"

Personal life
Youssef Arbash, the son-in-law of George Haswani, runs his Moscow office.

References

Living people
Russian people of Syrian descent
21st-century Syrian businesspeople
People from Rif Dimashq Governorate
Syrian Melkite Greek Catholics
20th-century Syrian people
21st-century Syrian people
Syrian individuals subject to U.S. Department of the Treasury sanctions
Syrian individuals subject to United Kingdom sanctions
Syrian individuals subject to the European Union sanctions
1946 births
Sanctioned due to Syrian civil war